William Downie Stewart (29 July 1878 – 29 September 1949) was a New Zealand Finance Minister, Mayor of Dunedin and writer.

Early life
Stewart was born in Dunedin in 1878. His father was William Downie Stewart, a lawyer and politician. His mother was Rachel Hepburn, daughter of George Hepburn. One of his four siblings was Rachelina (Rachel) Hepburn Armitage. Stewart's mother died within months of his birth, leaving him and his four siblings to be raised by nannies and nurses. From 1888–1894, he attended Otago Boys' High School and continued his studies at the University of Otago.

Political career 

Downie Stewart was the author of a number of books.
He and the American economist James Edward Le Rossignol of the University of Denver published State socialism in New Zealand in 1910. A reviewer called the book "an illuminating study of the remarkable series of instructive experiments in socialistic legislation, for which New Zealand has become conspicuous, together with that Australian Commonwealth, which is its nearest neighbour."

Downie Stewart was Mayor of Dunedin (1913–1914).
He represented the Dunedin West electorate from 1914 to 1935. His father had previously represented the Dunedin West electorate.

Minister of Finance and resignation 
Downie Stewart was Finance Minister in 1931–1933. He resigned after the devaluation of the New Zealand currency, a measure he opposed.  Downie Stewart stood in the 1935 general election as an Independent United-Reform Coalition candidate, losing to Labour's Dr Gervan McMillan.

In July 1934, he became the first chairman of the newly formed New Zealand Institute of International Affairs, the local branch of Chatham House. He ceded that position to Bill Barnard, the speaker of the House, the NZIIA merged with the local branch of the Institute of Pacific Relations in late 1939.

In 1935, he was awarded the King George V Silver Jubilee Medal.

Notes

References

|-

|-

|-

1878 births
1949 deaths
Independent MPs of New Zealand
Mayors of Dunedin
Members of the Cabinet of New Zealand
New Zealand defence ministers
New Zealand finance ministers
20th-century New Zealand lawyers
New Zealand writers
New Zealand Presbyterians
Reform Party (New Zealand) MPs
New Zealand people of World War I
University of Otago alumni
New Zealand people of Scottish descent
Unsuccessful candidates in the 1935 New Zealand general election
Unsuccessful candidates in the 1905 New Zealand general election
Members of the New Zealand House of Representatives
New Zealand MPs for Dunedin electorates
Justice ministers of New Zealand